The Gemenc Grand Prix is a cycling race held annually in Hungary. It was part of UCI Europe Tour in category 2.2 from 2005 to 2009 and back again in the same category in 2017.

Winners

References

 

Cycle races in Hungary
Recurring sporting events established in 1975
1975 establishments in Hungary
UCI Europe Tour races
Spring (season) events in Hungary